Gregg Hoffman (June 11, 1963 – December 4, 2005), born in Phoenix, Arizona, was a film producer responsible for developing Saw and Saw II.  He studied communications, law and economics at American University in Washington, D.C.  Hoffman was working on Saw III, Saw IV, and other films for Twisted Pictures when he died in a hospital in Hollywood, California of natural causes. He was 42 years old at his death. The movie Dead Silence (2007) was dedicated to him. He was also thanked in the film Gross Misconduct, mentioned as dedicatee for Saw III, and posthumously credited with producing the Saw films from 2007 through 2021.

Filmography
Only You (1992)
George of the Jungle 2 (2003)
Saw (2004)
Saw II (2005)
Saw III (2006)
Dead Silence (2007)
Catacombs (2007)

Saw IV (2007; posthumously)
Saw V (2008; posthumously)
Saw VI (2009; posthumously)
 Saw 3D (2010; posthumously)
Jigsaw (2017; posthumously)
Spiral (2021; executive; posthumously)

References

External links

1963 births
2005 deaths
Businesspeople from Phoenix, Arizona
Burials at Mount Sinai Memorial Park Cemetery
American University alumni
Film producers from Arizona
20th-century American businesspeople
20th-century American Jews
21st-century American Jews